The Archdiocese of Lipa is a Latin Church ecclesiastical territory or archdiocese of the Catholic Church in the Philippines comprising the civil province of Batangas. Its cathedral is the Cathedral of Lipa located in the episcopal see of Lipa. First created in 1910 from the Archdiocese of Manila, the diocese was elevated into its present status in 1972. Today, the Archdiocese of Lipa's ecclesiastical province covers Batangas and suffragan territories in the civil provinces of Quezon, Marinduque, and Aurora. The archdiocese itself is divided into 14 vicariates further comprising a total of 64 parishes.

In addition, the Archdiocese also serves as the de facto overseer of the Apostolic Vicariate of Calapan in Oriental Mindoro and San Jose in Occidental Mindoro, all exempt dioceses of the Holy See (with the vicariates under the jurisdiction of the Congregation for the Evangelization of Peoples).

History

Creation

The Diocese of Lipa was created on April 10, 1910, separating it from that of Manila under the supervision of Pope Pius X and with Giuseppe Petrelli as its first bishop. The diocese then covered the provinces of Batangas, Laguna, Tayabas (now Quezon, Marinduque, and Aurora), and Mindoro (now Occidental Mindoro and Oriental Mindoro). There were initially very few priests for the large diocese.

Petrelli invited different Roman Catholic religious institutes to come to his diocese and help minister to the spiritual needs of the faithful. He also conceived the building of a seminary in the diocese. In June 1914 a diocesan seminary was built in Bauan, which was later transferred to San Pablo in Laguna. This initiative of the first bishop was continued by the next bishop, Alfredo Verzosa, the diocese's first Filipino bishop, who served a long term from 1916 to 1950. He invited priests from the Society of St. Vincent de Paul to help in the administration of the new seminary.

On July 2, 1936, Mindoro was separated and came under the jurisdiction of the Apostolic Prefecture of Calapan. On March 28, 1950, Lucena became a diocese of its own covering the southern portion of Quezon and Marinduque. About a month later on April 25, the Prelature of Infanta was created, comprising the remaining part of Quezon, including the Polillo Islands and what is now the province of Aurora.

In 1950, Rufino Santos took over the diocese. Described as a financial administrator of great acumen, Santos applied for bank loans to help construct some buildings. This way he continued the construction work of the Lipa Cathedral and built a major seminary beside it.

The Diocese of San Pablo was separated on November 28, 1966, seated in the city of San Pablo and becoming a suffragan of Manila. This left the Diocese of Lipa covering only the province of Batangas.

Elevation into an archdiocese
With the departure of Santos for the Archdiocese of Manila came a young bishop, Alejandro Olalia, who stayed with the diocese from 1953 to 1973. It was during his term that the Diocese of Lipa, on June 20, 1972, became the country's tenth archdiocese and ecclesiastical province by order of Pope Paul VI. This same order elevated Olalia to the rank of archbishop on August 15, 1972.

Olalia died in 1973 and was replaced by Bishop Ricardo J. Vidal who stayed with the diocese until 1981. During his incumbency Vidal organized the Pastoral Council, and initiated the construction of the Lipa Archdiocesan Formation Center.

Vidal was replaced in 1981 by Bishop Mariano Gaviola, who stayed with the diocese from 1981 to 1993. He was at the helm of the archdiocese as it celebrated its 75th anniversary and on March 19, 1993, the reins of the archdiocese were again transferred, this time to Bishop Gaudencio Rosales, a native of Batangas City. He was ordained priest in Lipa in 1958, became Auxiliary Bishop of Manila in 1974, served as bishop in Malaybalay in 1982, and on December 30, 1992 he was elected Archbishop of Lipa. Rosales founded Aral Batangueño and the small giving foundation Pondong Batangan.

With the resignation of Cardinal Jaime Sin in 2003, Rosales was chosen by Pope John Paul II to be the Manila's new prelate, leaving the See of Lipa under the apostolic administration of its Auxiliary Bishop Jose Paala Salazar (d. 30 May 2004). On May 14, 2004, Pope John Paul II appointed Bishop Ramon Cabrera Arguelles of the Military Ordinariate of the Philippines, another native of Batangas City as the fifth Archbishop of Lipa.

In his 13 years in office, Arguelles canonically erected new parishes in Lipa City, Lemery, Taysan, Tanauan City and Batangas City and organized Marian events such as the annual Taal Lake Marian Regatta and National Days of Prayer in Lipa, both held every September. He is a strong opponent of the passage of RH Law,  the operation of motorist lodges in the province, the possible mining activities in the municipality of Lobo, and the construction of a coal-fire power plant in Batangas City. He also led the establishment of a local election watchdog separate from the Church-based PPCRV.

Pope Francis accepted the resignation of Argüelles on February 2, 2017 and then appointed Bishop Gilbert Garcera, the Bishop of the Diocese of Daet, Camarines Norte as its sixth Archbishop and eighth Local Ordinary.

Coat of arms
The cross and arrows are symbols of Saint Sebastian the Martyr, patron of the cathedral. The two white long-stemmed lilies are symbols of Saint Joseph, head  of the Holy Family, to whom the faithful of the diocese are ardently devoted. The bottom of the shield shows the lake and volcano of Taal in Batangas.

Organization

The archdiocese has jurisdiction over the Catholic faithful in the province of Batangas. The archdiocese also has general supervision over the suffragan dioceses and territorial prelatures for the provinces of Quezon and Marinduque.

The archdiocese is divided into 14 vicariates, each headed by a vicar forane. Except for the parishes in the 4th district of Batangas (excluding Taysan) which are run by the Oblates of St. Joseph, all other parishes are run by the diocesan clergy. There are 64 parishes in all, served by 143 priests. 122 of them diocesan. There are 13 religious brothers, and 197 religious sisters. Catholic schools number 23, high school seminaries 2 and college seminaries 3. Two pastoral centers are being maintained.

Suffragan dioceses
Diocese of Boac
Diocese of Gumaca
Diocese of Lucena
Prelature of Infanta

Archbishop

The seat of the Archbishop is in Metropolitan Cathedral of St. Sebastian. The
 
archbishop is also overseer of several suffragan dioceses of Lipa.

List of Archbishops of Lipa

Auxiliary bishops
Alfredo Maria Aranda Obviar: March 11, 1944 Appointed - November 4, 1950 Appointed Bishop of Lucena
Salvador Quizon Quizon: June 9, 1979 Appointed - April 6, 2002 Retired
Buenaventura Malayo Famadico: April 6, 2002 Appointed - June 11, 2003 Appointed Bishop of Gumaca
Jose Paala Salazar: June 11, 2003 Appointed - May 30, 2004 Died

Vision
On August 18, 1995 after much review, and meetings presided over by Archbishop Gaudencio Rosales himself, the archdiocese's vision was conceived:
A people of God called by the Father in Jesus Christ to be communities of totally developed human persons in the world, witnessing to the Kingdom of God by living the Paschal Mystery in the power of the Holy Spirit.

In the News
On April 10, 2010, the Archdiocese of Lipa celebrated the 100th anniversary of its elevation as a diocese by launching the coffee table book, A Century of Faith: The Local Church of Lipa. The event was held at the historic Basilica of St. Martin of Tours in Taal, Batangas.

See also
Roman Catholicism in the Philippines

References

External links
CBCP Article on the Archdiocese of Lipa
Archdiocese of Lipa Official Website 

Roman Catholic dioceses in the Philippines
Archdiocese
Christian organizations established in 1910
Roman Catholic dioceses and prelatures established in the 20th century
Lipa, Batangas
Religion in Batangas